Craig Nicholas Jones (born 19 December 1989) is an English football midfield player, who plays for Westfields. He started his career at Hereford Lads Club. He was then scouted by  Cardiff City, where he remained for several years before joining the Hereford United youth set up. Due to injuries to several other players Jones featured on the bench in two League matches at the beginning of December. He made his debut for Hereford in the 2–0 home defeat against Colchester United when he came on as a substitute for Stephen O'Leary in a game that relegated the club back into Football League Two.

On 27 March 2008 he was loaned to Bromsgrove Rovers for a month. In December 2008 he was loaned to Conference North side Redditch United for a month where he played in two league matches. He joined Westfields in the summer of 2010 after being released by Hereford United. He re-joined Hereford on non-contract terms on 21 March 2013. After not being offered a contract at Edgar Street he returned to Westfields for the start of the 2013–14 season.

References

External links
 Craig Jones profile at Hereford United F.C.

1989 births
Living people
Sportspeople from Hereford
English footballers
Association football midfielders
Cardiff City F.C. players
Hereford United F.C. players
Bromsgrove Rovers F.C. players
Redditch United F.C. players
English Football League players